Heriberto Gil Martinez (24 November 1903 – May 21, 1933) was a Colombian soldier.

Biography 
Martinez was born to Ramon Nonato Gil and Isabel Martínez de Gil.

Personal life 
They were married in 1927 with Ms. Leonor González Gómez, in France their first two children born Heriberto and Carlos, both military, Major of the National Army of Colombia, making use of good retirement, his third son, Edgar, recently deceased, was born in Colombia

Academic 
The firsts studied at the School of Caldas in the year 1912 under the direction of the brilliant educator Rafael Zuniga. He continued his studies under the guidance of teacher gift Rubén Cruz Vélez, which remained until the school year 1914. He went to public high schools today Pacific Gymnasium, which was then rector Dr. Rodrigo Becerra, where he remained until the year 1919. In the year 1920 moved to Bogota and entered the Technical Institute through a grant that was conferred to study engineering, but after two years, the natural inclination has always shown for her military career did drop out of Engineering to enter then the Military Cadet School.

Military Training 
In 1922 the College conferred the Diploma of lieutenant and enters the Military Course accordingly by written authorization issued by the Office of the Minister himself.

With the title goes to Sub-official weapon of the cavalry, Cavalry Regiment to post General Paez, where it remains for the space of a year proving to be a soldier bold and brave, serious and disciplined, sincere and faithful friend, willing always lend their assistance to the country since the opening of the Aviation course, his great passion, requested his transfer to the School of Aviation, their application being accepted in 1925, thus filling the greatest dream of his life, receiving the first national Brevet military aviation school that they issued from Director of the School Commander Pilichody for open competition among pilots Camilo Daza Alvarez, Eduardo Gomez Posada and other important officials.

Having been appointed Head of Airport Flanders, where he remained for a short time, he was transferred to the Military Academy in Madrid and then fixed his residence in the capital of the country. A short flight training without permission in the company of Justin Marino aircraft mechanic from the School to the town of Ambalema in December of that year, it causes serious problems with the Directorate, and is transferred accordingly Cavalry Regiment Neiva.

Moving to France 
In order to improve aeronautical knowledge, the War Department selected a group of officers among whom was awarded the Sub-Lieutenant Heriberto Gil Martinez for an extensive Specialization course in various disciplines in Paris. And before long, and Heriberto stood out among the peer group generates admiration and directors of the various courses. A result of this, his bravery and skill, an exception is made entering the recognition Heriberto "Squadron Storks," in which it operates alongside real aces of French aviation. Following the sequence laid out within the specialization program, passing the famous school of "Le Bourget", where it also highlights their bravery and ability, why the French government authorized to enter Sub-Lieutenant Gil Regiment 34 º. Aviation, the only distinction that has been done to date a foreigner because this unit can not enter but French officers, where he specializes in the line of fighter aircraft, being also the first foreign official to obtain the distinction to take direct command in the French aviation. And as a reward for their merits and the knowledge gained, the French government awarded him accordingly, the "Brevet de Pilote French Military Aviator," the highest degree obtainable in the world.

A little before returning to the country, the French government claims that the Colombian permission to send to the war in Morocco because of their skill and daring, and more being already established as a military pilot received French by Brevet days ago, a request that the Colombian government denied on the same tracks, thanks in advance for distinction.

Back in Colombia 
Back in Colombia, had several mishaps at not being located with timely resources case by the Ministry, which caused him a normal delay in the return to Colombia with his family, finally returning on February 11, 1931. This was taken in the wrong way, as a contempt of their orders, prompting the issuance of Decree No. 420 of 28 February of that year, by which he retired from active service.

Heriberto Gil had known widely the performance of a Colombian mission that had traveled to Europe in order to purchase items, spare parts and appliances, action on which he had referred in statements and comments through written media, which was also taken into account while issuing the said order., which had been challenged by Lt. Gil respective requesting review by the State Council, which, by final decision dated March 16, 1932, declared "absolutely zero "Decree 420 of February 28, 1931.

The Colombia-Peru War 
On 1. September 1932 in the early morning hours, Peruvian soldiers took the Colombian town of Leticia, located within the Amazon called Trapeze, which was established by the Treaty of Limits and Navigation "Salomon-Lozano" signed between the two States on March 24, 1922 = and then invaded Tarapacá. This violation of Colombian sovereignty began the war with Peru, better known as the "Conflict Amazon.

The President Enrique Olaya Herrera, his Minister of War, Captain (r) Carlos Uribe Gaviria, General Alfredo Vasquez Cobo and General Efraín Rojas Acevedo, began the defense the country and took appropriate action, improvising brackets with tourist ships from the north coast of the country joining in near the Colombian-Peruvian jungle to confront the armies of Peru's President Luis Miguel Sánchez Cerro.

Inside the country had attracted huge aggression Peruvian patriotism and to revive the various forces for national defense, the Army, Navy and Military Aircraft, the town was clear of jewelry and valuables to, inter alia, care of the wounded and prisoners of combat and expenses demanded the same military struggle.

The military aviation then going through a very critical situation, but nevertheless this, the Directorate General of Military Aviation formed what was called The Unified Air Fleet under South under Colonel Luis Acevedo Ruiz originally based in Caucayá and then in Puerto Boy, which was divided into three squadrons, small air units under the command of Major Herbert Boy, German pilot and veteran of World War, manager of the airline Scadta.

The squadrons were composed of the cream of Colombian aviation and Lt. Heriberto Gil, known among his peers as the " 'Chato'", Gil was assigned to the Third Squadron, taking as companions Captain Arthur Lemos Inn, Captain Ernesto Esguerra and Captain Jose Ignacio Forero.

The work of the officers was intense aviators, as well as the different missions that must constantly make to their fighters, as were those of observation, reconnaissance, transport troops and military supplies and provisions, had to establish airlift aircraft between several sites because of the difficult conditions of the thick jungle. The contest required to be continuously alert to always act with precision and quickly, without rest, for the alarms, one after another, they always kept ready.

Lieutenant Gil, always beside his plane, an Osprey, average machine between the planes of observation and hunting, gave proof of great patriotism in each of the interventions that played an active part, which were many, but where it was really important and their participation was important in making Puerto Güeppi on Sunday 26 March 1933, where after nine months of the detachment Colombian armed conflict began its attack on Peru's position of Güeppi in the courageous and overwhelmingly supported by artillery fire mountain artillery and gunboats ARC ARC Cartagena and Santa Marta bombing squadron air force, which was decisive, consisting of eleven aircraft attacking for eight continuous hours. Undoubtedly, this was the most important and decisive action throughout the contest, he excelled, according to the commentary of his own comrades, Lt. Gil Martinez, for his courage, bravery, skill and chivalry.

Death 
Barely two months after taking Puerto Güeppi, the Fleet Air South, which had already submitted the disappearance of Captain Ernesto Guevara, the 21 May 1933 experiencing a new event with extremely painful and irreparable consequences. Finding Caucayá Lt. Gil (now Puerto Leguizamo) pursuant to superior orders, should continue to Puerto Boy in the plane Junkers 202 pilot in command of the German Martin Haenichen, mecánicos Rafael Hernandez, Narciso Combariza and Erich Rettich, this also German, as indeed happened, leaving the 202 in midday with that destination.

Account Colonel Jose Ignacio Forero that below Caucayá had begun to form a strong storm, and although the Junkers took off smoothly, to make a shift to La Tagua, a powerful blast he invested, thus falling to the Putumayo River drowned where the pilot of the ship, Lt. Gil and mechanics Combariza and Fernandez. The mechanic Erich Rettich, excellent swimmer, managed to stay on the surface, clinging to one of the floats until he was rescued.

Regarding

Book Tulua - History and Geography 
In the book "Tulua - History and Geography", the historian and writer Guillermo E. toluene Martínez M., note that "the bodies of the abortive military remained for 15 days immersed in the waters of the Putumayo River, and that after that time, the body of Lt. Gil was buried in the cemetery where he stayed for Caucayá 7 years. In 1940, on November 2, the National Government through the Military Aviation Base Cali moved the remains to his hometown of Tulua, where they were placed in a mausoleum erected to his memory by the municipality. He gave them, on behalf of the Government, Flight Lieutenant Hector MATERON and received them on behalf of the municipality and the family of Mr. Guillermo E. hero Martinez M. The Department of Valle del Cauca, and on behalf of the Assembly by Order dated March 23, 1934, honored his memory and ordered the placement of a marble plaque at the birthplace of Lt. Gil Martínez, with the following inscription: "The Department of Valle del Cauca, the hero and patriot aviator, Lt. Heriberto Martínez Gil.

Homage 
Countless tributes paid him to toluene military celebrated throughout the national territory by the national government, the Ministry of War, of all the institutions that provided their invaluable services, the political directors of civic institutions, with great deployment of national spoken and written press.

The renamed Farfan Airport
In 2004, Council Fernando Caicedo Ochoa, a member of the Municipal Council of Tulua  submitted to the Corporation on 9 August a draft agreement to give the Airport Farfan tulueño illustrious name. And so it was that recognition, now long overdue, was made through the adoption of Resolution No. 16, August 20, 2004, "THROUGH WHICH THE FARFAN AIRPORT IS NAMED AFTER HERIBERTO GIL MARTINEZ.

Arguably this laudable decision of the Honorable City Council, is worthy of celebrating and supporting, since it is the beginning of a process of recognizing those who have given luster to the city in different fields of thought and action. The rescue from oblivion of the memory of those who gave their lives for their country's progress and greatness of the country, is something which will be returned to the city.

See also 
 History of Aviation
 Timeline of aviation
 Heriberto Gíl Martínez Airport
 Colombia-Peru War

References 

Gil
Gil
Gil
Gil